Valgejärv Landscape Conservation Area is a nature park in Harju County, Estonia, near the village of Siimika.

Its area is 723 ha.

The protected area was designated in 1981 to protect  and its surrounding areas. In 2005, the protected area was recategorized to a landscape conservation area.

References

Nature reserves in Estonia
Geography of Harju County